Let's do it 2008 was a large campaign on 3 May 2008, to activate civic society in Estonia in an effort to cleanup the country from litter. It was organized by Let's Do It! World.

Preparation

The litter pickup spots were marked by volunteers beforehand who used mobile phones to record the locations to a mapping system similar to Google maps.  locations were recorded in total. Cultural figures, such as Jaan Tätte and Jarek Kasar , helped promote the campaign by participating in televised advertisements. Over  partners helped during the cleanup organization process. Volunteers registering to the cleanup were asked to form 3-15 member teams, with each team receiving instructions before the cleanup day via e-mail.

Cleanup
Over  people, or approximately 4% of the population of 1.3 million, participated in the cleanup of the forests and countryside. More than  tons of garbage were removed from the country's forest in about 5 hours for less than  euros. Under normal circumstances it would have taken the government 3 years and 22.5 million euros to accomplish a similar feat.

The organization team consisted of Rainer Nõlvak, Toomas Trapido, Kadri Allikmäe, Henri Laupmaa, Ahti Heinla, Eva Truuverk, Tiina Urm, Anneli Ohvril and Jüri-Ott Salm.

Spreading the model
Shortly after the event, Latvia organized a similar nation-wide event every year. In September 2008,  volunteers participated. Lithuania and Latvia organized larger scale events in April 2009 with  volunteers.
On 17 April 2010 a similar event was organized in Slovenia - Let's Clean Slovenia in One Day! (Očistimo slovenijo v enem dnevu) with 12% of population participating ( volunteers). And again in 2012: Let's Clean Slovenia 2012.
In 2017, the United States held their first National Cleanup Day and joined with Let's Do It! World.

Worldwide cleanup events eventually led to the international organization Let's Do It! World, and the creation of a unified World Cleanup Day program, and the inaugural World Cleanup Day event in 2018.

See also
 Earth Day
 Greenpeace
 National Cleanup Day
 The Ocean Cleanup
 Let's Do It! World

References

External links
 Let's Do It World site

News and videos 
 Youtube video: Country clean-up project "Lets Do It 2008" / Teeme Ära 2008
 Tigerprises: Innovation award goes to Let's do it
 AFP: Software gurus launch cleanup of Estonia

Organized events
2008 in Estonia
Historical events in Estonia